Smerinthus caecus, the northern eyed hawkmoth, is a moth of the family Sphingidae. The species was first described by Édouard Ménétries in 1857.

Distribution
It is found in Russia from St. Petersburg and Moscow to the Ural Mountains and across western Siberia and north-eastern Kazakhstan to the Altai Mountains. Although it has been reported as far north as Syktyvkar and Yaksha in European Russia, the exact distribution is not known as it is often confused with Smerinthus ocellatus. Outside of Europe, it is found in central and eastern Siberia, the central and southern Sakha Republic, and the Russian Far East (Askold Island, Sakhalin Island, Kurile Islands and southern Kamchatka). It is also present in Mongolia, South Korea, northern Japan (Hokkaido and northern Honshu) and north-eastern China (Nei Mongol, Heilongjiang, Jilin, Liaoning, Hebei, and Shanxi). There are recent reports from Belarus, Daghestan and southern Russia, but this last report might be a mistake as it is far from the normal range.
The habitat consists of grassy boreal forests, especially in clearings and along streams and lake fringes.

Description
The wingspan is 50–65 mm.

Biology
Adults are on wing from end May/June to early July in one generation. There might be a partial second generation in August if the first adults emerge in May or early June.

The larvae feed on Salix and Populus species.

References

External links

Smerinthus
Moths described in 1857
Moths of Japan